Hiser may refer to:

People
Gene Hiser (born 1948), professional baseball player
Berniece T. Hiser (1908-1995), writer

Places
Hiser, Indiana, an unincorporated community in Wayne County
Hiser, West Virginia